The 1932 Pacific Tigers football team represented the College of the Pacific—now known as the University of the Pacific—in Stockton, California as a member of the Far Western Conference (FWC) during the 1932 college football season. The team was led by Erwin Righter in his 12th and final season as head coach, and played home games at Baxter Stadium in Stockton. Pacific compiled an overall record of 4–4 with a mark of 2–2 in conference play, placing fourth in the FWC. The Tigers outscored their opponents 125 to 73 for the season.

Schedule

References

Pacific
Pacific Tigers football seasons
Pacific Tigers football